Ciambella (plural, ciambelle) is an Italian ring-shaped cake with regional varieties in ingredients and preparation. As an example, a basic version of the cake could be prepared using flour, baking powder, salt, eggs, milk (or cream), sugar, oil and vanilla flavoring. Honey is sometimes added as a sweetener. To create the light texture the sugar and eggs are whisked together, and oil and milk are added while whisking continuously until the mixture is frothy. Then sifted baking powder and flour are added to the dry ingredients and the cake is baked in a ring shaped pan. 

Butter may be used instead of oil, and mixed berry yogurt (yogurt ai frutti di bosco) can be added to the batter. Common flavorings include lemon, orange, chocolate or cocoa, hazelnuts and vanilla. The finished cake may be decorated with powdered sugar, pine nuts, toasted almond pieces, apricot jelly or pistachios.

Regional

Many regions have registered one or more types of ciambella in their official list of traditional food products, including:

Calabria
cuddrurieddru, a sweet fried doughnut made with flour and boiled potatoes, typically made at Christmas.
Campania
graffa, a sweet fried doughnut made with flour and potatoes, covered with caster sugar, often best when eaten just out of the frier, very soft. 
Emilia-Romagna
ciambella ferrarese, a baked doughnut made with flour, sugar, eggs and butter. Originally an Easter dish.
Lazio
ciambella a cancello, 'gate doughnut' with an intricate rosette shape, made using aniseed and local wine.
ciambella all'acqua, 'water doughnut', so-called because it is first boiled in water and then baked.
ciambella ellenese, a small, knot-shaped doughnut made with cinnamon and covered with rose water.
Marche
ciambella frastagliata, 'jagged doughnut', made with mistrà (aniseed-flavour liquor) and a high proportion of egg, which is boiled, dried with a cloth, cut in half and baked until crispy.
ciambellone typically shaped as a loaf of bread is a traditional sweet of the Marches. Unlike the other types, this ciambella has a more firm consistency which allows it to be stuffed whether with hazelnut cocoa spread or marmalade.

Origin and history
The Ciambella is a simple, but popular sweet all over Italy, although it is considered a symbol of the Marche region (The Marches). It was originally consumed during buffets, family dinners, or weddings. In present times it is mostly served for breakfast with milk, or as a snack during the day.  

A widespread belief says that the sweet recipe was created by Leone Ciambelli, a Spanish pastry chef living in Madrid. 
He was worldwide famous for his cakes, especially his sponge cake.  

Leone was often participating in pastry competitions and thanks to his exquisite cakes he was continuously winning new awards. That’s why he was keeping every recipe for himself.  Yet, the day before one of the competitions Ciambelli was participating in, his biggest rival stole his recipe and sent his young son, Osvaldo to ruin his cake. Osvaldo did that by engraving in the middle of the cake an “O” as the initial of his name. 

Seeing his cake ruined, Leone felt very sad and lost, thinking he won’t be able to win the contest any longer. Yet, the judges were surprised by the cake with a hole inside and found Leone’s dessert original. That’s why he won first place, and, in his memory, the new-shaped sweet was called “Ciambella”.

References 

Italian pastries